Roland MacLeod (1935 – 3 April 2010) was an English actor working in film and television.  He was born in London.

His television credits include Coronation Street, Softly, Softly, Ripping Yarns, The Fall and Rise of Reginald Perrin, Sykes, Please Sir!, Some Mothers Do 'Ave 'Em, Marty, Broaden Your Mind and The Goodies. He also made some appearances in Season Three of Grange Hill as a slightly comical workman sporting a comb over, often seen in confrontation with staff and pupils. However, his character showed a kinder side when he cleaned Duane Orpington's new coat in episode two. He also played the mad Head Teacher in The Boot Street Band, a TV series written by Steve Attridge and Andrew Davies.

He appeared as a vicar in John Cleese's film A Fish Called Wanda as well as in Le Pétomane  and The Last Remake of Beau Geste.

References

External links
 

1935 births
2010 deaths
English male film actors
English male television actors